The Montreal Dragons were a professional Canadian basketball team based in Montreal, Quebec. They competed in the now defunct National Basketball League in 1993, but did not complete their first season and disbanded on June 10, 1993. During their first and only season, the Dragons won 6 games and lost 11 games.

The Montreal Dragons was coached by Eric Dennis and the roster included notable players Reggie Cross, George Ackles, Dwight Walton, and Wayne Yearwood. The team's home court was the Verdun Auditorium. Since the disbandment of the Dragons, there have been 7 other short-lived professional teams in Montreal. The Montreal Alliance currently competes in the Canadian Elite Basketball League (CEBL).

References

National Basketball League (Canada) teams
Defunct basketball teams in Canada
Basketball teams established in 1993
Sports clubs disestablished in 1993
Basketball teams in Montreal
1993 establishments in Quebec
1993 disestablishments in Quebec